Sadalas is the name of three kings of the Odrysian kingdom of Thrace.

 Sadalas I, reigned before 87 BCE to after 79 BCE
 Sadalas II, reigned 48 BCE – 42 BCE
 Sadalas III, reigned 42 BCE – 31 BCE, possibly the son of Sadalas II